Magdalena Smith Villaruz (born 1934) is an entrepreneur and inventor from the Philippines. Originally a rice farmer, she went on to transform agricultural technology by creating the turtle hand tractor and many other ground-breaking inventions.

In February 1986, Villaruz was awarded the WIPO Gold Medal in Metro Manila for her inventions of the turtle hand tractor (also known as the power cultivator) and several others. In July 1995, she was awarded another WIPO Gold Medal in Cebu, Philippines for various inventions, including the screen type thresher. Her inventions have helped the advancement of Philippine agricultural technology.

Patented Inventions 

 Turtle power tiller
 Rice thresher rush
 Leveling device
 Diaphragm pump
 Dual diaphragm pump
 (Improved) power cultivators
 Household rice huller
 (Improved) corn sheller
 (Simplified) hand tractor
 Combination harrow-leveler
 Floating operator's seat
 Adjustable engine mount
 Three-wheeled vehicle with passenger seats
 (Improved) power cultivator assembly
 Blower for thresher discharge ejector
 Two-speed transmission assembly for power
 Improved windmill

Recognition and awards 
 WIPO Gold Medal 1986 - Best Inventor  
 WIPO Gold Medal 1995 - Best Woman Inventor

Organizations and Affiliations 
 Philippine Invention Development Institute (PIDI)
 Technology Application and Promotion Institute, Department of Science and Technology (TAPI/DOST)
 United Nations Development Organization (UNIDO)
 National Agricultural & Fishery Council (NAFC)
 Experts on Technical Cooperation for Developing Countries (TCDC)
 ASEAN Productivity Center, Development Academy of the Philippines

References

1934 births
Living people
Filipino inventors